EducationSuperHighway is a United States nonprofit organization that directs research and provides advocacy and consultation services to states and school districts in order to connect American public school classrooms to high-speed internet. The organization was founded by Evan Marwell in 2012 with the goal to ensure all American classrooms are connected with the FCC-recommended minimum speed of 100 kbit/s per student. In 2013, EducationSuperHighway raised $9 million in funding led by Facebook CEO Mark Zuckerberg's Startup:Education fund, with additional funding coming from the Gates Foundation. The organization has published a yearly State of the States report that compiles data from the FCC's E-Rate program and helps to connect schools with the funding offered by ERate.

In 2015, the organization raised an additional $20 million from Zuckerberg and his wife Priscilla Chan. That same year, EducationSuperHighway's founder and CEO was recognized by the San Francisco Chronicle as Visionary of the Year for the organization's work.

References

Educational organizations based in the United States
Organizations based in San Francisco
2012 establishments in California